The Bezirksliga is commonly a medium set of amateur divisions  set at steps 7, 8 or 9 in the German football league system.

Structure 
Depending on the structural organisation within each of the 21 state football associations of the German Football Association, the Bezirksliga either falls under the state association's jurisdiction or one of its subsidiary county football associations that organise their divisions mostly following the borders of the corresponding government districts. In the league pyramid, the Bezirksliga always ranks below the superior state association's divisions, typically being the Verbandsliga and the Landesliga but ahead of the district associations' Kreisliga.

The Bezirksliga does not exist within all associations, and where existing it is set in varying numbers and form. The former Bezirksoberliga is currently not existing in the league system, as the Hesse state association renamed the division to Gruppenliga and as the state associations of Lower Saxony and Bavaria disbanded the league in recent years.

Overview by state association

References

External links
Das deutsche Fussball Archiv 
Bavarian League tables and results
Tables and results from German amateur leagues

 
8